Juan Corso (died 1685) was a Corsican pirate and guarda costa privateer who sailed in Spanish service, operating out of Cuba.

History

Corso sailed alongside Spanish privateer Pedro de Castro under commander Felipe de la Barreda y Villegas in April 1680, rounding up Englishmen illegally harvesting logwood in the Laguna de Términos off Campeche, partially in retaliation for English buccaneers Edward Neville and George Spurre's 1678 sack of Campeche. They sailed the Yucatan coast and took a number of ships, one of which had earlier been captured from the Spanish by English buccaneer John Coxon. Corso was known for his savagery: “The Spaniards killed two men and cruelly treated the deponent, hanging him up at the fore braces several times, beating him with their cutlasses, and striking him in the face after an inhuman cruel manner.” And later: “This Juan a month since took a boat of ours bound to New Providence; he has killed divers of our people in cold blood. In one case he cut off a man's head because he was sick and could not row so strongly as he expected. Barbarities like these and worse he commits daily.” He returned alone and was arrested when de Castro was suspected of piracy. Released in early 1681, he rejoined de Castro and patrolled off the Cuban coastline for the next two years.

Though Spanish settlements were threatened primarily by French buccaneers at the time, Corso repeatedly attacked English ships as well. English officials complained throughout 1683 and 1684 to Spanish Governors in Havana and elsewhere about Corso's piracy and his increasing brutality, as well as his attack on New Providence in the Bahamas, but were rebuffed. His actions also incensed French buccaneers, who threatened to sack Cuban towns in return.
 
In May 1685 Corso sailed again with de Castro to eliminate La Salle's new French colony on the Texas coastline. They were caught in storms and nearly driven ashore. After sending some men to look for the Frenchmen they sailed out again only to be caught in rough weather once more. Their ship was lost at sea with all hands, Corso included. The remainder of their expedition - just nine men - resorted to cannibalism to survive. A year later at least one of the ships he'd captured was retaken by English buccaneers and sailed into New York, where its Captain begged the government to seize it and return the vessel to its owners.

See also

Edmund Cooke, an English logwood cutter who joined Coxon's expedition after losing two ships to Spanish privateers.

Notes

Further reading
Little, Benerson. How History's Greatest Pirates Pillaged, Plundered, and Got Away With It: The Stories, Techniques, and Tactics of the Most Feared Sea Rovers from 1500-1800. Beverly, MA: Fair Winds Press, 2010. - Has an entire chapter devoted to Juan Corso.

References

17th-century pirates
Year of birth missing
Privateers
Pirates
Spanish pirates
1685 deaths
Piracy in the Caribbean
Spanish mass murderers